Sibo Kai, an Indian politician. Kai was nominated by the Governor of Arunachal Pradesh to the Arunachal Pradesh Legislative Assembly in 1978 (just after the 1978 election), becoming the first female member of that body. Kai was nominated in order to represent the Singpho people, an otherwise unrepresented group in the Assembly.

References

Possibly living people
Year of birth missing
Indian National Congress politicians from Arunachal Pradesh
Arunachal Pradesh MLAs 1978–1980
Women members of the Arunachal Pradesh Legislative Assembly
20th-century Indian women politicians
20th-century Indian politicians